Chondrometopum is a genus of picture-winged flies in the family Ulidiidae.

Species
 C. arcuatum
 C. leve

References

Ulidiidae